Weißmann (Weissmann, Weiszmann, Waismann) is a German surname meaning "white man". Common variants in spelling are Weismann, Weissman, Weisman, Waismann, and Vaisman.

Science 
 Charles Weissmann, biochemist
 Irving Weissman, scientist
 August Weismann (1834–1914), German biologist, evolutionary theorist and proposer of the Weismann barrier
 Mariana Weissmann (born 1933), Argentinian physicist
 Samuel Isaac Weissman, chemist and professor
 Sherman Weissman (born 1930),
 Jonathan Weissman

Medicine 
 Joel Weisman (1943–2009), American doctor, one of the first to recognize AIDS
 Weismann-Netter-Stuhl Syndrome, Congenital osteopathic syndrome named after French doctors Weismann-Netter and Stuhl.

Philosophy
 Friedrich Waismann (1896–1959), Austrian-Jewish mathematician, physicist, and philosopher. 
 Max Weismann, American philosopher.

Politics & Law 
 Augustus Weismann (1809–1884), New York politician
 Keith Weissman, senior Iran analyst of AIPAC.
 Samuel Weissman, New York Times employee, implicated in McCarthy hearings
 Lee v. Weisman (a Supreme Court case)
 Gerda Weissmann Klein, Holocaust survivor who memoirist, human rights activist and noted speaker
 Andrew Weissmann, American attorney and prosecutor

Business & Education 
 Joe Weisman & Company
 George Weissman, ex-president of Philip Morris
 Weissman School of Arts and Sciences, part of Baruch College

Film & Television 
 Jeffrey Weissman, actor
 Adam Weisman (born 1986), American actor
 Greg Weisman (born 1963), American writer and actor
 Kevin Weisman (born 1970), American actor
 Robin Weisman (born 1984), American child actress
 Sam Weisman, American film director
 Malina Weissman (born 2003), American actress
 Richard (Ricky) Weissman (born 1981), VFX Artist/Special Effects

Sports 
 Diana Vaisman (born 1998), Belarusian-born Israeli sprinter
 Nico Weissmann, German footballer
 Shon Weissman, Israeli footballer

Literature 
 Alan Weisman (born 1947), journalist, author and editor
 Asher Simcha Weissmann (1840–1892), Austrian writer and rabbi
 Jon Weisman (born 1967), American writer
 Marcus Weissmann-Chajes (1831–1914), Galician Jewish writer

Graphics 
 Steven Weissman, cartoonist
 Greg Weisman (born 1963), American comic book writer
 Jordan Weisman, American game designer

Art 
 Franz Weissmann, Austrian born Brazilian sculptor.
 Frederick Weisman Museum of Art
 Frederick R. Weisman Museum of Art, California
 Janice Urnstein Weissman (born 1944), American painter
Andrew Weissmann, Designer Dealer Mid Century Modern Art

Music 
 Ben Weisman (1921–2007), American composer and pianist
 Joel Weisman (born 1967), American musician and writer
 Theodor Weissman (1891–1966), Finnish singer and actor

Military 
 Eugene Weismann (1896 - 1973), French First World War flying ace

Fictional characters 
 Georg Weissmann, main antagonist of the video game The Legend of Heroes: Trails in the Sky SC

 Midge Weissman, protagonist in The Marvelous Mrs. Maisel

 Adolf K. Weismann, protagonist of K (TV Series)

See also 
 Wiseman (surname)
 Weizmann
 Weitzman

Surnames